Phyllospadix, surfgrass, is a genus of seagrass, a flowering plant in the family Zosteraceae, described as a genus in 1840.  Phyllospadix grows in marine waters along the coasts of the temperate North Pacific.

It is one of the seagrass genera that can perform completely submerged pollination.

Species 
Accepted species
Phyllospadix iwatensis – China, Korea, Japan, Russian Far East
Phyllospadix japonicus – China, Korea, Japan
Phyllospadix juzepczukii – Russian Far East
Phyllospadix scouleri (type species) – Alaska to Baja California
Phyllospadix serrulatus – Alaska, British Columbia, Washington
Phyllospadix torreyi – British Columbia to northwestern Mexico

References

External links 

Images of Phyllospadix at Algaebase

 
Alismatales genera
Biota of the Pacific Ocean
Salt marsh plants